Richard Grant (born 1952) is a science fiction and fantasy author.

List of works
 Saraband of Lost Time (1985) Nominated Philip K. Dick Award-Science Fiction
 Rumors of Spring (1986) – Fantasy
 Views from the Oldest House (1989) – Fantasy
 Through the Heart (1991) Winner Philip K. Dick Award-Fantasy
 Tex and Molly in the Afterlife (1996) – Fiction
 In the Land of Winter (1997) – Fiction
 Kaspian Lost (1999)
 Another Green World (2006)
 "Drode's Equations" (1981), a short story that appeared in New Dimensions 12 and is available in the science fiction anthology The Ascent of Wonder: The Evolution of Hard SF, edited by David G. Hartwell and Kathryn Cramer (1994)

External links
 Richard Grant's blog
 Fantastic Fiction's entry on Richard Grant

1952 births
Living people
20th-century American novelists
21st-century American novelists
American fantasy writers
American male novelists
American science fiction writers
Place of birth missing (living people)
American male short story writers
20th-century American short story writers
21st-century American short story writers
20th-century American male writers
21st-century American male writers